The Island at the Center of the World: The Epic Story of Dutch Manhattan and the Forgotten Colony That Shaped America is a 2005 non-fiction book by the American journalist Russell Shorto. It covers the period of Manhattan under Dutch colonial rule, when the territory was called New Netherland. The book also discusses the conflict between Adriaen van der Donck and Peter Stuyvesant.

References

External links
Presentation by Shorto on The Island at the Center of the World, April 22, 2004, C-SPAN

2005 non-fiction books
New Netherland